Gien is a railway station in Gien, Centre-Val de Loire, France. The station is on the Moret-Lyon railway. The station is served by Intercités (long distance) services operated by SNCF between Paris and Nevers.

References

Railway stations in Loiret